The Russian steam locomotive class O (from ) was an early type of Russian steam locomotives. 9,129 locomotives were built between 1890 and 1928; hence it was the second most numerous class of locomotive in Russia, after E class, which was a unique number even on the international level.

Variants
Basic variants were early Od and OD (Russian: Од, OД) with Joy valve gear and most numerous later OV (OВ) with Walschaerts valve gear. Some locomotives were built as two cylinder simple expansion and others as two cylinder compounds.

Armoured locomotives
During World War I, the Russian Civil War and the Eastern Front of World War II O-class locomotives were widely used as standard armoured locomotives in armoured trains due to rugged construction and low silhouette. Relatively lightweight, these locomotives could carry more armor without overloading the track.

Gallery

See also
 The Museum of the Moscow Railway, at Paveletsky Rail Terminal, Moscow
 Rizhsky Rail Terminal, Moscow, Home of the Moscow Railway Museum
  Russian Railway Museum, Saint Petersburg
 Finland Station, St.Petersburg
 History of rail transport in Russia

References

External links
The Moscow Railway Museum at Rizhsky Rail Terminal
 Report on a visit to the Varshavsky Rail Terminal

Railway locomotives introduced in 1890
О
0-8-0 locomotives
О
5 ft gauge locomotives